Patrice Brun, (born 1953, Pessac) is a French historian, a specialist of ancient Greece and epigraphy. 
His research focuses on the history of classical and Hellenistic Greece. He was president of the Bordeaux Montaigne University between 2009 and 2012.

Bibliography 
1983: Eisphora, syntaxis, stratiotika : recherches sur les finances militaires d'Athènes au IVe, Belles Lettres/Annales littéraires de l'université de Besançon. 
1995: Les Archipels égéens, V° - II° siècles av. J.C., Paris, Les Belles Lettres
2000: L'orateur Démade. Essai d'histoire et d'historiographie, Bordeaux, Editions Ausonius,
2003: Le monde grec à l'époque classique 500-323 a.c, Paris, Armand Colin,
2005: Impérialisme et démocratie à Athènes. Inscriptions de l'époque classique, Paris, Armand Colin,
2009: La bataille de Marathon, Paris,  Éditions Larousse,
2014: De la renonciation comme acte politique. Chronique d'une présidence d'université, Bordeaux III, 2009-2012, Le Bord de l'eau,
2015:

External links 
 Patrice Brun on the site of the Bordeaux Montaigne University
 Patrice BRUN on .rdv-histoire.com
 

Heads of universities in France
21st-century French historians
French hellenists
1953 births
People from Gironde
Living people